The 1982–83 NBA season was the Spurs' seventh season in the NBA and 16th season as a franchise.

Draft picks

Roster

Regular season

Season standings

z - clinched division title
y - clinched division title
x - clinched playoff spot

Record vs. opponents

Game log

Regular season

|- align="center" bgcolor="#ccffcc"
| 1
| October 29
| @ Utah
| W 120–114
|
|
|
| Salt Palace Acord Arena
| 1–0
|- align="center" bgcolor="#ccffcc"
| 2
| October 30
| Portland
| W 112–107
|
|
|
| HemisFair Arena
| 2–0

|- align="center" bgcolor="#ffcccc"
| 3
| November 3
| @ Seattle
| L 107–109
|
|
|
| Kingdome
| 2–1
|- align="center" bgcolor="#ccffcc"
| 4
| November 4
| @ Portland
| W 108–107 (OT)
|
|
|
| Memorial Coliseum
| 3–1
|- align="center" bgcolor="#ccffcc"
| 5
| November 5
| @ Golden State
| W 105–104
|
|
|
| Oakland–Alameda County Coliseum Arena
| 4–1
|- align="center" bgcolor="#ccffcc"
| 6
| November 7
| Phoenix
| W 101–100
|
|
|
| HemisFair Arena
| 5–1
|- align="center" bgcolor="#ccffcc"
| 7
| November 9
| Utah
| W 120–114
|
|
|
| HemisFair Arena
| 6–1
|- align="center" bgcolor="#ffcccc"
| 8
| November 11
| @ San Diego
| L 105–109
|
|
|
| San Diego Sports Arena
| 5–3
|- align="center" bgcolor="#ffcccc"
| 9
| November 13
| Seattle
| L 98–107
|
|
|
| HemisFair Arena
| 6–3
|- align="center" bgcolor="#ffcccc"
| 10
| November 16
| Kansas City
| L 102–105
|
|
|
| HemisFair Arena
| 6–4
|- align="center" bgcolor="#ccffcc"
| 11
| November 17
| @ Washington
| W 114–112
|
|
|
| Capital Centre
| 7–4
|- align="center" bgcolor="#ffcccc"
| 12
| November 19
| @ Boston
| L 111–119
|
|
|
| Boston Garden
| 7–5
|- align="center" bgcolor="#ccffcc"
| 13
| November 20
| Golden State
| W 134–112
|
|
|
| HemisFair Arena
| 8–5
|- align="center" bgcolor="#ccffcc"
| 14
| November 23
| Denver
| W 136–126
|
|
|
| HemisFair Arena
| 9–5
|- align="center" bgcolor="#ffcccc"
| 15
| November 24
| @ Denver
| L 123–129
|
|
|
| McNichols Sports Arena
| 9–6
|- align="center" bgcolor="#ccffcc"
| 16
| November 26
| Chicago
| W 122–120
|
|
|
| HemisFair Arena
| 10–6
|- align="center" bgcolor="#ccffcc"
| 17
| November 27
| @ Dallas
| W 107–106
|
|
|
| Reunion Arena
| 11–6
|- align="center" bgcolor="#ccffcc"
| 18
| November 30
| Los Angeles
| W 117–114
|
|
|
| HemisFair Arena
| 12–6

|- align="center" bgcolor="#ffcccc"
| 19
| December 1
| @ Detroit
| L 97–105
|
|
|
| Pontiac Silverdome
| 12–7
|- align="center" bgcolor="#ccffcc"
| 20
| December 3
| Houston
| W 88–78
|
|
|
| HemisFair Arena
| 13–7
|- align="center" bgcolor="#ffcccc"
| 21
| December 4
| @ Houston
| L 93–94
|
|
|
| The Summit
| 13–8
|- align="center" bgcolor="#ccffcc"
| 22
| December 7
| Dallas
| W 106–92
|
|
|
| HemisFair Arena
| 14–8
|- align="center" bgcolor="#ccffcc"
| 23
| December 8
| @ Kansas City
| W 102–101 (OT)
|
|
|
| Kemper Arena
| 15–8
|- align="center" bgcolor="#ccffcc"
| 24
| December 10
| @ New Jersey
| W 114–102
|
|
|
| Brendan Byrne Arena
| 16–8
|- align="center" bgcolor="#ffcccc"
| 25
| December 11
| Kansas City
| L 110–122
|
|
|
| HemisFair Arena
| 16–9
|- align="center" bgcolor="#ccffcc"
| 26
| December 14
| @ Houston
| W 102–93
|
|
|
| The Summit
| 17–9
|- align="center" bgcolor="#ccffcc"
| 27
| December 16
| @ Denver
| W 120–108
|
|
|
| McNichols Sports Arena
| 18–9
|- align="center" bgcolor="#ccffcc"
| 28
| December 17
| Utah
| W 110–103
|
|
|
| HemisFair Arena
| 19–9
|- align="center" bgcolor="#ffcccc"
| 29
| December 19
| @ Milwaukee
| L 98–113
|
|
|
| MECCA Arena
| 19–10
|- align="center" bgcolor="#ffcccc"
| 30
| December 21
| Phoenix
| L 113–114
|
|
|
| HemisFair Arena
| 19–11
|- align="center" bgcolor="#ffcccc"
| 31
| December 26
| Philadelphia
| L 122–124
|
|
|
| HemisFair Arena
| 19–12
|- align="center" bgcolor="#ccffcc"
| 32
| December 29
| San Diego
| W 124–115
|
|
|
| HemisFair Arena
| 20–12
|- align="center" bgcolor="#ccffcc"
| 33
| December 30
| @ Chicago
| W 105–102
|
|
|
| Chicago Stadium
| 21–12

|- align="center" bgcolor="#ccffcc"
| 34
| January 2
| @ Cleveland
| W 103–95
|
|
|
| Richfield Coliseum
| 22–12
|- align="center" bgcolor="#ccffcc"
| 35
| January 4
| @ Atlanta
| W 104–95
|
|
|
| The Omni
| 23–12
|- align="center" bgcolor="#ffcccc"
| 36
| January 5
| @ Dallas
| L 131–136
|
|
|
| Reunion Arena
| 23–13
|- align="center" bgcolor="#ffcccc"
| 37
| January 7
| Boston
| L 113–116
|
|
|
| HemisFair Arena
| 23–14
|- align="center" bgcolor="#ccffcc"
| 38
| January 11
| Dallas
| W 109–101
|
|
|
| HemisFair Arena
| 24–14
|- align="center" bgcolor="#ffcccc"
| 39
| January 12
| @ Kansas City
| L 113–118
|
|
|
| Kemper Arena
| 24–15
|- align="center" bgcolor="#ccffcc"
| 40
| January 14
| Houston
| W 96–92
|
|
|
| HemisFair Arena
| 25–15
|- align="center" bgcolor="#ccffcc"
| 41
| January 15
| Washington
| W 117–96
|
|
|
| HemisFair Arena
| 26–15
|- align="center" bgcolor="#ccffcc"
| 42
| January 18
| Denver
| W 143–124
|
|
|
| HemisFair Arena
| 27–15
|- align="center" bgcolor="#ffcccc"
| 43
| January 19
| @ Phoenix
| L 113–118
|
|
|
| Arizona Veterans Memorial Coliseum
| 27–16
|- align="center" bgcolor="#ffcccc"
| 44
| January 21
| @ Los Angeles
| L 110–119
|
|
|
| The Forum
| 27–17
|- align="center" bgcolor="#ffcccc"
| 45
| January 23
| Portland
| L 107–108
|
|
|
| HemisFair Arena
| 27–18
|- align="center" bgcolor="#ccffcc"
| 46
| January 25
| @ Utah
| W 116–106
|
|
|
| Salt Palace Acord Arena
| 28–18
|- align="center" bgcolor="#ccffcc"
| 47
| January 27
| @ Indiana
| W 143–138
|
|
|
| Market Square Arena
| 29–18
|- align="center" bgcolor="#ccffcc"
| 48
| January 29
| New Jersey
| W 120–109
|
|
|
| HemisFair Arena
| 30–18

|- align="center" bgcolor="#ffcccc"
| 49
| February 2
| New York
| L 98–109
|
|
|
| HemisFair Arena
| 30–19
|- align="center" bgcolor="#ffcccc"
| 50
| February 4
| @ Seattle
| L 103–115
|
|
|
| Kingdome
| 30–20
|- align="center" bgcolor="#ffcccc"
| 51
| February 5
| @ Golden State
| L 102–106
|
|
|
| Oakland–Alameda County Coliseum Arena
| 30–21
|- align="center" bgcolor="#ccffcc"
| 52
| February 8
| Detroit
| W 147–143 (OT)
|
|
|
| HemisFair Arena
| 31–21
|- align="center" bgcolor="#ccffcc"
| 53
| February 10
| Golden State
| W 128–109
|
|
|
| HemisFair Arena
| 32–21
|- align="center" bgcolor="#ccffcc"
| 54
| February 15
| @ Los Angeles
| W 124–103
|
|
|
| The Forum
| 33–21
|- align="center" bgcolor="#ffcccc"
| 55
| February 16
| @ Utah
| L 101–112
|
|
|
| Salt Palace Acord Arena
| 33–22
|- align="center" bgcolor="#ccffcc"
| 56
| February 20
| Atlanta
| W 103–100
|
|
|
| HemisFair Arena
| 34–22
|- align="center" bgcolor="#ccffcc"
| 57
| February 23
| Portland
| W 124–114
|
|
|
| HemisFair Arena
| 35–22
|- align="center" bgcolor="#ccffcc"
| 58
| February 25
| @ Kansas City
| W 131–125
|
|
|
| Kemper Arena
| 36–22
|- align="center" bgcolor="#ffcccc"
| 59
| February 26
| Milwaukee
| L 104–107
|
|
|
| HemisFair Arena
| 36–23

|- align="center" bgcolor="#ccffcc"
| 60
| March 1
| Seattle
| W 119–104
|
|
|
| HemisFair Arena
| 37–23
|- align="center" bgcolor="#ffcccc"
| 61
| March 2
| @ Phoenix
| L 106–110
|
|
|
| Arizona Veterans Memorial Coliseum
| 37–24
|- align="center" bgcolor="#ccffcc"
| 62
| March 4
| @ San Diego
| W 107–99
|
|
|
| San Diego Sports Arena
| 38–24
|- align="center" bgcolor="#ccffcc"
| 63
| March 6
| Cleveland
| W 117–98
|
|
|
| HemisFair Arena
| 39–24
|- align="center" bgcolor="#ffcccc"
| 64
| March 8
| @ Denver
| L 118–129
|
|
|
| McNichols Sports Arena
| 39–25
|- align="center" bgcolor="#ccffcc"
| 65
| March 9
| Phoenix
| W 108–105
|
|
|
| HemisFair Arena
| 40–25
|- align="center" bgcolor="#ccffcc"
| 66
| March 12
| Golden State
| W 131–120
|
|
|
| HemisFair Arena
| 41–25
|- align="center" bgcolor="#ccffcc"
| 67
| March 15
| San Diego
| W 130–109
|
|
|
| HemisFair Arena
| 42–25
|- align="center" bgcolor="#ccffcc"
| 68
| March 17
| @ San Diego
| W 111–101
|
|
|
| San Diego Sports Arena
| 43–25
|- align="center" bgcolor="#ccffcc"
| 69
| March 19
| Indiana
| W 138–118
|
|
|
| HemisFair Arena
| 44–25
|- align="center" bgcolor="#ffcccc"
| 70
| March 22
| @ Portland
| L 102–119
|
|
|
| Memorial Coliseum
| 44–26
|- align="center" bgcolor="#ffcccc"
| 71
| March 23
| @ Seattle
| L 117–137
|
|
|
| Kingdome
| 44–27
|- align="center" bgcolor="#ccffcc"
| 72
| March 25
| @ Los Angeles
| W 132–120
|
|
|
| The Forum
| 45–27
|- align="center" bgcolor="#ccffcc"
| 73
| March 29
| Denver
| W 136–129
|
|
|
| HemisFair Arena
| 46–27

|- align="center" bgcolor="#ccffcc"
| 74
| April 1
| Houston
| W 124–99
|
|
|
| HemisFair Arena
| 47–27
|- align="center" bgcolor="#ccffcc"
| 75
| April 2
| @ Houston
| W 112–101
|
|
|
| The Summit
| 48–27
|- align="center" bgcolor="#ccffcc"
| 76
| April 5
| Kansas City
| W 130–113
|
|
|
| HemisFair Arena
| 49–27
|- align="center" bgcolor="#ccffcc"
| 77
| April 6
| @ Philadelphia
| W 112–109
|
|
|
| The Spectrum
| 50–27
|- align="center" bgcolor="#ffcccc"
| 78
| April 8
| @ New York
| L 100–102 (OT)
|
|
|
| Madison Square Garden
| 50–28
|- align="center" bgcolor="#ffcccc"
| 79
| April 9
| Dallas
| L 111–122
|
|
|
| HemisFair Arena
| 50–29
|- align="center" bgcolor="#ccffcc"
| 80
| April 13
| Los Angeles
| W 114–109
|
|
|
| HemisFair Arena
| 51–29
|- align="center" bgcolor="#ccffcc"
| 81
| April 15
| Utah
| W 121–118
|
|
|
| HemisFair Arena
| 52–29
|- align="center" bgcolor="#ccffcc"
| 82
| April 16
| @ Dallas
| W 132–120
|
|
|
| Reunion Arena
| 53–29

Playoffs

|- align="center" bgcolor="#ccffcc"
| 1
| April 26
| Denver
| W 152–133
| George Gervin (42)
| Gene Banks (11)
| Johnny Moore (17)
| HemisFair Arena10,116
| 1–0
|- align="center" bgcolor="#ccffcc"
| 2
| April 27
| Denver
| W 126–109
| George Gervin (30)
| Artis Gilmore (12)
| Johnny Moore (20)
| HemisFair Arena10,690
| 2–0
|- align="center" bgcolor="#ccffcc"
| 3
| April 29
| @ Denver
| W 127–126 (OT)
| Johnny Moore (39)
| Artis Gilmore (14)
| Johnny Moore (12)
| McNichols Sports Arena16,965
| 3–0
|- align="center" bgcolor="#ffcccc"
| 4
| May 2
| @ Denver
| L 114–124
| Johnny Moore (27)
| Artis Gilmore (11)
| Johnny Moore (9)
| McNichols Sports Arena15,035
| 3–1
|- align="center" bgcolor="#ccffcc"
| 5
| May 4
| Denver
| W 145–105
| George Gervin (26)
| Artis Gilmore (15)
| Johnny Moore (13)
| HemisFair Arena12,736
| 4–1
|-

|- align="center" bgcolor="#ffcccc"
| 1
| May 8
| @ Los Angeles
| L 107–119
| Mike Mitchell (26)
| George Gervin (9)
| Johnny Moore (18)
| The Forum15,063
| 0–1
|- align="center" bgcolor="#ccffcc"
| 2
| May 10
| @ Los Angeles
| W 122–113
| George Gervin (32)
| Artis Gilmore (20)
| Johnny Moore (15)
| The Forum17,505
| 1–1
|- align="center" bgcolor="#ffcccc"
| 3
| May 13
| Los Angeles
| L 100–113
| Mike Mitchell (23)
| Artis Gilmore (14)
| Johnny Moore (9)
| HemisFair Arena15,782
| 1–2
|- align="center" bgcolor="#ffcccc"
| 4
| May 15
| Los Angeles
| L 121–129
| Mike Mitchell (35)
| Mike Mitchell (11)
| Johnny Moore (17)
| HemisFair Arena15,782
| 1–3
|- align="center" bgcolor="#ccffcc"
| 5
| May 18
| @ Los Angeles
| W 117–112
| Mike Mitchell (26)
| Artis Gilmore (14)
| Johnny Moore (17)
| The Forum17,505
| 2–3
|- align="center" bgcolor="#ffcccc"
| 6
| May 20
| Los Angeles
| L 100–101
| George Gervin (25)
| Artis Gilmore (18)
| Johnny Moore (14)
| HemisFair Arena15,782
| 2–4
|-

Player statistics

Season

Playoffs

Awards and records
George Gervin, All-NBA Second Team

Transactions

References

See also
1982-83 NBA season

San Antonio Spurs seasons
S
San Antonio
San Antonio